G Lake can be one of these locations:

Canada 

 , Nova Scotia,

United States 

 G Lake (New York), Hamilton County, 
 G Lake (Colorado), Moffat County, 
 G Lake (Alaska, North Slope Borough), 
 G Lake (Alaska, Yukon-Koyukuk Census Area),

See also

 
 G Lake Outlet, New York